François Perrot (26 February 1924 – 20 January 2019) was a French film actor. He appeared in more than one hundred films from 1954 onwards.

Theater

Filmography

References

External links
 	
	
	

1924 births
2019 deaths
Male actors from Paris
French male film actors